"A Disney Christmas Gift" is an animated Christmas television special produced by Walt Disney Productions. It was originally broadcast on CBS on December 4, 1982 as part of the Walt Disney anthology series.

Synopsis
The special is a Christmas-themed compilation of classic short cartoons featuring Mickey Mouse and Donald Duck combined with excerpts from Disney feature films, including Melody Time, Bambi, Peter Pan, The Sword in the Stone and Cinderella. Three holiday-themed theatrical shorts are also included: the 1933 Silly Symphony short The Night Before Christmas, 1945's Donald Duck short The Clock Watcher and 1952's Pluto short Pluto's Christmas Tree.

The opening and closing numbers, featuring the song "On Christmas Morning" and its reprise, showcased Christmas at Disneyland. The lyrics were written by Linda Laurie with music by John Debney.

Throughout the 1980s and 1990s, the original full-length and shortened versions of A Disney Christmas Gift were rebroadcast on CBS and The Disney Channel. It was released on VHS, Betamax, CED and LaserDisc in 1984 and again in the 1990s but has not yet been released on DVD.

Featured segments
 "Once Upon a Wintertime" – Melody Time (1948)
 "Mickey Mouse, Pluto and Chip 'n' Dale" – Pluto's Christmas Tree (1952)
 "Bambi and Thumper" – Bambi (1942)
 "Peter Pan and the Darling children" – Peter Pan (1953)
 "Donald Duck" – The Clock Watcher (1945)
 "Merlin, Arthur and Archimedes" – The Sword in the Stone (1963)
 "Cinderella and Fairy Godmother" – Cinderella (1950)
 "Santa Claus" – The Night Before Christmas (1933)

Credits
 Disney's Sing-Along Songs You Can Fly & Disney's Sing-Along Songs Zip-A-Dee-Doo-Dah clips courtesy of Walt Disney Home Video.
 Toys from the collection of The Walt Disney Archives.
 This Program is the result of the talents of many creative people at The Walt Disney Studios.
 The contribution of the ANIMATION STAFF is particularly appreciated.

See also
 From All of Us to All of You

References

1982 American television episodes
1982 television specials
1980s American television specials
American Christmas television episodes
CBS television specials
Disney television specials
Walt Disney anthology television series episodes
American Christmas television specials